Ciz is a surname. The Czech and Slovak form Číž (feminine: Čížová) refers to the Eurasian siskin (Spinus spinus). The surname is related to Čížek, as well as Czyż (Polish cognate) and Chyzh (Belarusian).

Notable people with this surname include:

Adam Číž (born 1991), Czech basketball player
Diego Ciz (born 1981), Uruguayan footballer
Miroslav Číž (1954–2022), Slovak politician

See also

Czech-language surnames
Slovak-language surnames